Hilary Stellingwerff (née Edmondson; born August 7, 1981 in Sarnia, Ontario) is a Canadian track and field middle-distance runner. She competed in the 1500m event at the 2012 Summer Olympics, reaching the semifinals. She personal best for the 1500 metres is 4:05.08 minutes, set in 2012.

She was runner-up at the Canadian Track and Field Championships in 2012, where she achieved the Olympic qualifying standard.

In July 2016 she was officially named to Canada's Olympic team.

International competitions

References

External links
 

1981 births
Living people
Sportspeople from Sarnia
Canadian female middle-distance runners
Olympic track and field athletes of Canada
Athletes (track and field) at the 2012 Summer Olympics
Athletes (track and field) at the 2016 Summer Olympics
Commonwealth Games competitors for Canada
Athletes (track and field) at the 2006 Commonwealth Games
Athletes (track and field) at the 2010 Commonwealth Games
World Athletics Championships athletes for Canada
Competitors at the 2005 Summer Universiade